The Carnival Prince (German: Der Faschingsprinz) is a 1928 German silent film directed by Rudolf Walther-Fein and starring Marianne Winkelstern, Harry Liedtke and Hans Junkermann.

The film's art direction was by Botho Hoefer and Hans Minzloff.

Cast
 Marianne Winkelstern 
 Harry Liedtke 
 Hans Junkermann 
 Julia Serda 
 Valeria Blanka 
 Kurt Vespermann 
 Hermann Picha 
 Antonie Jaeckel 
 Irene Krauß

References

Bibliography
 Günter Krenn. Walter Reisch: Film schreiben. Verlag Filmarchiv Austria, 2004.

External links

1928 films
Films of the Weimar Republic
Films directed by Rudolf Walther-Fein
German silent feature films
German black-and-white films